The Rusciori (also: Rușcior) is a left tributary of the river Cibin in Romania. It discharges into the Cibin in the city Sibiu.

References

Rivers of Romania
Rivers of Sibiu County